The marbled mountain catfish (Amphilius jacksonii) is a species of fish in the family Amphiliidae. It is found in Burundi, Kenya, Tanzania, and Uganda. Its natural habitat is rivers.

References

marbled mountain catfish
Freshwater fish of East Africa
Taxonomy articles created by Polbot
marbled mountain catfish
Siluriformes